Carlos Ángel Roa (born 15 August 1969) is an Argentine former professional footballer who played as a goalkeeper. He is the current goalkeeper coach of Greek Super League club AEK Athens.

Most of his professional career was spent with Racing Avellaneda and in Spain with Mallorca, winning one major trophy with the latter. Roa was first-choice for the Argentina national team at the 1998 World Cup.

Club career
Born in Santa Fe, Roa started playing professionally for Racing Club de Avellaneda, making his Primera División debut on 6 November 1988 at the age of 19. During a summer tour of Africa with the club he contracted malaria, but fully recovered. In 1994 he moved to Club Atlético Lanús, rarely missing a match with the Buenos Aires Province side as they achieved three consecutive third-place league finishes (one in 1995, two in 1996), and adding the Copa CONMEBOL in 1996.

Roa then signed with Spain's RCD Mallorca alongside Lanús teammate Óscar Mena, playing 25 La Liga matches as the Balearic Islands club finished fifth straight out of Segunda División and also reached the final in the 1997-98 Copa del Rey, lost against FC Barcelona on a penalty shoot-out.

In the 1999 summer, after helping Mallorca win the domestic Supercup and reach the final of the UEFA Cup Winners' Cup (already accompanied in the team by former Lanús teammates Ariel Ibagaza and Gustavo Siviero), 30-year-old Roa retired from football in order to take a religious retreat. After a year of charitable and religious work spent as a member of his church, his convictions led to his refusal to discuss a new contract with his team because he believed the world was going to end in the near future.

Less than one year later, Roa nicknamed the Lechuga  returned to Mallorca, forced to play out the remaining two years of his contract. Never being able to reproduce his previous form, he was relegated to the bench by compatriot Leo Franco.

Subsequently, Roa moved to another Spanish team, second division Albacete Balompié, appearing in 39 league games as the Castile-La Mancha side returned to the top division after a seven-year absence. Midway through the following season, he was diagnosed with testicular cancer and was forced to stop playing; after surgery, he spent an entire year between chemotherapy and rehabilitation.

After keeping his fitness with amateurs CD Constancia and CD Atlético Baleares, both in the Majorca area, Roa returned to professional football and his country, joining Olimpo de Bahía Blanca and retiring after one top division season. In 2008 he joined amateurs Club Atlético Brown as goalkeeper coach and, two years later, he was appointed assistant manager at Club Sportivo Ben Hur; in the former capacity, he went to work under former international teammate Matías Almeyda at Club Atlético River Plate, Club Atlético Banfield and C.D. Guadalajara.

International career
In 1992, Roa appeared for Argentina at the 1992 CONMEBOL Pre-Olympic Tournament in Paraguay, which saw the country fail to qualify for the 1992 Summer Olympics. He was selected by the full side for the 1998 FIFA World Cup in France: after not conceding any goals during the group stage, he saved the decisive penalty in the shootout against England in the round-of-16, denying Newcastle United's David Batty. The national team was eventually defeated in the following match by the Netherlands (1–2).

Honours

Player
Racing
Supercopa Sudamericana: 1988

Lanús
Copa CONMEBOL: 1996

Mallorca
Supercopa de España: 1998
UEFA Cup Winners' Cup: Runner-up 1998–99
Copa del Rey: Runner-up 1997–98

Individual
Awards 
Ricardo Zamora Trophy: 1997–98
ESM Team of the Year: 1998–99

Personal life
Roa who is a member of the Seventh-day Adventist Church and a vegetarian is married and has two daughters.

References

External links

1969 births
Living people
Footballers from Santa Fe, Argentina
Argentine footballers
Association football goalkeepers
Argentine Primera División players
Racing Club de Avellaneda footballers
Club Atlético Lanús footballers
Olimpo footballers
La Liga players
Segunda División players
RCD Mallorca players
Albacete Balompié players
Argentina international footballers
1998 FIFA World Cup players
1997 Copa América players
Argentine expatriate footballers
Expatriate footballers in Spain
Argentine expatriate sportspeople in Spain
Argentine Seventh-day Adventists
Christian vegetarianism
San Jose Earthquakes non-playing staff